Springfield is an unincorporated community in Springfield Township, LaPorte County, Indiana.

History
Springfield was laid out in 1833.

Geography

References

Unincorporated communities in LaPorte County, Indiana
Unincorporated communities in Indiana